Nagendra Karri (born November 28, 1985) is an American film director, producer and screenwriter. He made his feature film directorial debut with the suspense thriller Where are you Sophia (2010).He followed it with his critically acclaimed film Mobster (2015). Karri received widespread recognition in 2018 for writing social Cold War drama Stanley Cage that is being turned into a feature film to be released in 2020.

Karri entered the Hollywood film Industry in 2008, following a brief stint as a Wall St finance executive. After years of working on numerous theatre plays as an assistant director and scriptwriter, he made his debut as a director during 2010 with the popular suspense thriller Where are you Sophia (WAYS) that was selected for Cannes and Tribeca film festivals.

Karri's "Where are you Sophia" which premiered in Tribeca film festival during 2010 garnered huge commercial and critical success paving the way for many social dramas that were written by him and was produced by Eternal mind media group.

Early life
Karri graduated with Bachelors in Computer Science & Engineering from  JNTU, Andhra Pradesh. At 20, Karri landed in United States of America to pursue his higher education. He graduated with Masters in Computer Science & Electronics Engineering from Oregon State University, Oregon. His other educational pursuits include a Masters in Film Making & Direction from University of California Berkeley, CA.

Filmmaking was Karri's first love, but he had to pursue his career in finance and Information technology and only got into the film business after years of being an understudy to successful producers and directors in his field.

Career
Nagendra Karri started his career working with a private brokerage firm LPL Financial, San Diego. He moved to New York City in 2006, and worked on a high-end security system for Department of Health, New York City.

He started Eternal Mind Productions in 2007 with the backing of some venture capitalists and indie film producers that paved his way for directing his debut film. His first few original film scripts include "Mobster - A Call for the New Order", "Where are you Sophia?", "GATE 21", "Chronicles of Kurukshetra", "Human Aliens", and "The Reds".

In 2009, Nagendra Karri directed and produced Where are you Sophia?, a psychological suspense thriller which had a worldwide release in early Feb 2010 and premiered in the Cannes film festival, IFFI and Tribeca.

In 2012, Nagendra Karri formed the two hundred million "Al-Muhaymin" film fund with a syndicate of Middle Eastern Investors which produced commercially successful and critical acclaimed independent hollywood and Arabic film projects from 2012-15.

Karri was roped in as the CEO of skanda media group in 2016 which has helped skanda media branch into infrastructure domain for media and entertainment projects in Louisiana. Skanda media under Karri's leadership has partnered with Chinese investment fund to undertake a major studio construction project that is expected to be completed in 2022. Karri is currently working to come up with his next upcoming release in 2020, "Stanley Cage".

References 

Writers from Oregon
Oregon State University alumni
1982 births
Living people
American people of Indian descent
American film producers
English-language film directors